Thomas McGovern may refer to:

 Thomas McGovern (bishop) (1832–1898), second Roman Catholic Bishop of Harrisburg, Pennsylvania
 Thomas McGovern (politician) (1851–1904), Irish nationalist politician, Member of Parliament for West Cavan, 1900–1904
 Thomas Michael McGovern (born 1944), president of Fisher College